The European Composer and Songwriter Alliance (ECSA) is an international, non-profit organization  based in Brussels, and composed by more than 55 associations of composers and songwriters in more than 25 different European countries. It represents around 30,000 music creators and  was founded in 2007. ECSA is co-financed by the Creative Europe Programme of the European Union.

ECSA is a European network whose main objective is to defend and promote the rights of music authors on a national, European, and international level. The Alliance advocates for equitable commercial conditions for composers and songwriters and strives to improve the social and economic development of music creation in Europe.

The three main genres of music composition are represented within ECSA in three different committees (APCOE, ECF and FFACE which represent respectively: popular music, art & contemporary music, and film & audio-visual music). ECSA President is Helienne Lindvall, who was elected to this position in February 2022

History 
The foundation for ECSA was laid on 4 February 2006 when a group of 100 composers from over 30 European Countries met at the European Composers' Congress at :Musikverein in Vienna to sign a letter of intent in order to create a "Federation of European Composers Association".
On 7 March 2007, three associations, the Alliance of Popular Composer Organizations in Europe (APCOE), European Composers' Forum (ECF), and the Federation of Film and Audio-visual Composers of Europe (FFACE), came together in Madrid to form the European Composer and Songwriting Alliance (ECSA).

Structure 
ECSA is organized into three committees based on music genre: the Alliance of Popular Music Composers of Europe (APCOE), the European Composers Forum (ECF), and the Federation of Film and Audiovisual Composers of Europe (FFACE). The ECSA board is made up of 9 members, three from each of the committees. The current president, chosen from these 9 members, is Helienne Lindvall from the APCOE committee. The ECSA office (ECSA Secretariat), located in Brussels, Belgium, is an administrative office that handles day-to-day business.

Advocacy 

ECSA actively defends the value of authors’ rights and the interests of music creators towards various public institutions and different stakeholders. The Alliance aims at creating a fair and sustainable framework for creators as well as ensuring an appropriate and proportionate remuneration for all music authors. ECSA is also active at international level and is a member of the European Music Council (EMC) and the International Music Council (IMC). ECSA is also a permanent observer to the International Council of Music Creators (CIAM). Furthermore, the Alliance monitors the work and discussions held at the World Intellectual Property Organization (WIPO).

Copyright Directive 

ECSA has worked extensively to defend and promote the 2019 Copyright Directive and improve its provisions to the benefit of composers and songwriters.  Ever since the 2019 Copyright Directive was passed in Europe, ECSA has been promoting a fair and ambitious implementation of the Directive in all EU Member States, in close coordination with its member organisations. The Alliance’s priorities are primarily the implementation of Articles 17 to 23 of the Directive.

Buyout contracts 

Buyout contracts have become an increasingly worrisome issue for European authors. Such practices deprive music authors from royalties and from a proportionate remuneration for the exploitation of their works. ECSA is actively fighting against buy out contracts and has published in May 2022 a report to assess this phenomenon and promote alternatives to such contracts.

The Creators Conference 

The Creators Conference is an initiative which aims at creating a forum for industry stakeholders, politicians, and other interested parties to meet and discuss key issues for authors and creators. The first conference was held in 2012 and that year, ECSA and the Creators Conference were presented the Visit Brussels Award at International Congress 2012. The most recent Creators Conference took place at Théâtre du Vaudeville in Brussels on 3 February 2020. It focused mainly on current and upcoming EU policies affecting music creators like the EU Copyright Directive and the future of the Creative Europe Programme.

Music streaming 

Making music streaming sustainable for composers and songwriters is a key priority for ECSA. The Alliance and its member organisations have denounced the extremely low level of remuneration coming from music streaming platforms. ECSA calls on  policymakers and stakeholders to remedy the fundamental flaws and market failures of the music streaming market for music creators, cultural diversity and European citizens alike. Read ECSA’s position paper on music streaming.

In continuity with its advocacy activities on music streaming, ECSA organised a roundtable with MEPs and experts on 1 December 2020. In January 2021, ECSA also held a panel discussion on music streaming at the Eurosonic Noorderslag 2021 where various stakeholders discussed the repartition of the streaming pie, as well as the dangers of streaming revenue getting lost, notably due to metadata issues.

Cultural Activities

ECCO 
ECCO is a European Composer and Songwriter Alliance (ECSA) project dedicated to reperforming and promoting contemporary art music and reaching new audiences. It operates as a network of active ensembles, orchestras and young professionals, supporting the creative dialogue between composers and performers and offering young professionals the opportunity to develop their skills with ensembles experienced in performing contemporary music on an international level.

Camille Awards 
The Camille Awards or the European Film Composer Awards are a set of awards given to composers of exceptional pieces of film and audio-visual music. The first Camille Awards ceremony was held in 2014 and was an initiative by the ECSA honorary Vice-President - Bernard Grimaldi.

The 2021 edition was organized as a digital event on YouTube. The event was organised in partnership with FAME’s Studio Orchestra Music Recording Company and OTICONS.

The European Film Music Day (EFMD) 

The European Film Music Day (EFMD) is an event bringing together audio-visual composers, film directors, producers and professionals alike. In 2021, the EFMD was organised digitally and brought together experts for two panel discussions on “Composing for Video Games – The Creative Process” and “Buy-outs in the audio-visual sector: How is the problem affecting music creators?” The EFMD was previously held in the framework of the Cannes Film Festival on a yearly basis and it was organised in partnership with La Quinzaine des Réalisateurs.

Members

Collaboration with other organizations 

ECSA collaborates both within Europe and overseas with the Human Rights Council of the United Nations, the Society of Composers and Lyricists (SLC), the Songwriters Association of Canada, and the International Music Council.

See also
 Camille Awards

References

Cultural organisations based in Belgium
International organisations based in Belgium